Dan Klecko (born January 12, 1981) is a former American football defensive tackle and fullback. He was drafted by the New England Patriots in the fourth round of the 2003 NFL Draft. He played college football at Temple.

Klecko has also been a member of the Indianapolis Colts, Philadelphia Eagles and Atlanta Falcons. He has earned three Super Bowl rings in his career - two with the Patriots and one with the Colts. He is the son of former New York Jets defensive lineman Joe Klecko.

Professional career

New England Patriots
He was drafted by the New England Patriots in the fourth round (117th pick overall) in the 2003 NFL Draft. Klecko has been a versatile player; he attended Saint Patrick School in Malvern, PA, Great Valley High School, graduated from Marlboro High School, and then Temple University as a defensive lineman, but was moved to linebacker in the summer of 2004. He has seen time on special teams, and in his rookie season was a blocking fullback on five of the Patriots' nine running touchdowns.

Klecko was cut by the Patriots after the 2006 preseason.

Indianapolis Colts
Shortly after his release from New England, Klecko signed with the Indianapolis Colts.

With the Colts, he occasionally filled in for the injured James Mungro as fullback during the 2006 season. Klecko scored his first career touchdown on a 2nd and goal four-yard pass from Peyton Manning against the Miami Dolphins on December 31, 2006.

He also caught a touchdown against the New England Patriots, his former team, to tie the game in the 3rd quarter of the 2006 AFC Championship game. The Colts went on to win that game. They advanced and won Super Bowl XLI in Miami, Florida.

Klecko was declared an unrestricted free agent on March 2, 2007, but on March 24, 2007, he re-signed with the Colts, agreeing to a one-year contract.

On November 17, 2007, Klecko was waived by the Colts. He was re-signed three days later.

Philadelphia Eagles
On March 14, 2008, Klecko was signed by his hometown Philadelphia Eagles, who intended to convert him back to fullback. He was brought in to compete with the incumbent Jason Davis. After the Eagles traded for former teammate Luke Lawton, Klecko has been moved back to his natural defensive tackle position. He registered a sack against the St. Louis Rams in his first game for the Eagles.

On October 8, 2008, it was announced that Klecko would be moved back to fullback. He switched jersey numbers from No. 68 to No. 49. In the 2009 preseason, the Eagles moved Klecko to defensive tackle and switched his jersey number back to No. 68. He was released from the Eagles on September 5, 2009.

Atlanta Falcons
Klecko signed a reserve/future contract with the Atlanta Falcons on January 11, 2010. He was waived on September 3.

Personal
He is the son of Pro Football Hall of Famer, Joe Klecko, best known as a member of the New York Jets' "New York Sack Exchange" of the early 1980's where he featured along side Mark Gastineau, Marty Lyons, and Abdul Salaam.

References

External links
Indianapolis Colts bio
New England Patriots bio
Philadelphia Eagles bio

1981 births
Living people
Marlboro High School alumni
People from Marlboro Township, New Jersey
American football defensive tackles
American football defensive ends
American football linebackers
American football fullbacks
Temple Owls football players
New England Patriots players
Indianapolis Colts players
Philadelphia Eagles players
Atlanta Falcons players
Players of American football from Pennsylvania
Sportspeople from Chester, Pennsylvania